Kaisei may refer to:

Kaisei (ship), the STS Kaisei
Kaisei, Kanagawa, a town in Japan
Kaisei Academy, a Japanese boys' school

People with the name
, retired Japanese Brazilian professional sumo wrestler
, Japanese footballer

See also
 Project Kaisei, a mission to clean up the Great Pacific garbage patch

Japanese masculine given names